Centre for Civil Society (CCS) is a non-profit think tank based in New Delhi. The Centre was founded in 1997 by Dr Parth J Shah, former Professor of Economics at the University of Michigan. It operates as an independent educational organisation.

According to the 2021 Global Go To Think Tank Index Report (Think Tanks and Civil Societies Program, University of Pennsylvania), CCS was ranked 5th in India and 83rd in the world.

Founder 
Dr Parth Shah taught economics at the University of Michigan in Dearborn for seven years before returning to India to advocate for what he calls a ‘Second Freedom Movement’ for economic, social and political independence. He arrived at the conclusion that the statist model of governance was the reason for India's lack of development and decided to provide an alternative view through the Centre.

History 
CCS is an independent think tank focused on educating on liberal principles of decentralisation, freedom and individual rights, and policy reform for inclusive and sustainable development. Over the past two decades, CCS has been working on three main areas of development: education, livelihoods, and policy training. Since 2021, the Centre also aims to spearhead its work on terracotta environmentalism.

Mission 
The organisation's mission is to advance social change through public policy. According to its website, their work "in education, livelihood, and policy training promotes choice and accountability across private and public sectors", and "translates policy into practice" by "engaging with policy and opinion leaders through research, pilot projects and policy training.”

CCS undertakes reviews and analyses of policies and on the basis of these, makes suggestions to the government on policy making. It has worked in six sectors in the past, i.e. education, livelihood, economic freedom, governance, institution of community property rights for environment conservation, and promotion of globalization and trade. It publishes policy reviews and legislative analyses on different issues, organizes public policy seminars for journalists, young leaders, development professionals, and public officials.

Activities

Education

Foundational learning 
 Bolo English is a pan-India initiative of the Centre, that equips children from low income families with much-aspired spoken English skills. It is the first of its kind project by CCS that utilises education technology. In its first year, Bolo English has had a reach of 30,000 students and 500 teachers across 130 schools in 8 states. The Centre works with teachers and parents through capacity building initiatives and leverages on this to keep the students engaged on the application.

K-12 education and budget private schools
 In a big win for CCS ideas on K-12 education, the National Education Policy (NEP) 2020 accurately diagnosed the need to separate functions of the government and recognised the need to revisit the existing regulatory framework. Since 2019, CCS has developed an extensive understanding of state education operations and a strong reputation in the sector for its regulatory expertise. One such example is its dominant presence in the State of the Sector Report in 2020. The chapter on regulations for private schools cited six CCS reports and the state profiles used the database we had created of all existing regulations governing K-12 education in India.
 CCS has also been successfully collaborating with Niti Aayog on creating a Model State Education Act for school education based on the principles of choice, autonomy, and accountability and the recommendations of the NEP.
 In addition to several widely recognised research papers and policy briefs addressing key aspects of education policy in India, CCS has published two editions of its Report on Budget Private Schools in India: a comprehensive research report that addresses the demand, supply, ecosystem, and regulations impacting budget private schools in India. In 2019, CCS’ report on the Anatomy of K-12 Governance in India was also featured as one of the best policy reports worldwide in the 2019 Global Go To Think Tank Index Report, University of Pennsylvania.

Livelihoods & Poverty Alleviation

Street vendors livelihood 
 From viewing street vendors as a “public nuisance” to recognising them as “public service providers” and entrepreneurs, the Street Vendors Act 2014 has been an important benchmark for CCS outreach efforts. The Act gives the long overdue formal status to millions of vendors.
 CCS prepared a draft amendment and submitted it to the Government committee set up for discussing amendments to the Street Vendors Act 2014 in October 2020. The amendment bill is likely to be tabled in the next session of the Parliament. CCS also presented the underlying reasons for non-implementation of the Act to the Parliamentary Standing committee set up to study the implementation of the street vendors Act.

Ease of doing business for micro, small, and medium enterprises 
 In 2020, CCS conceptualised a project to ease the regulatory environment for MSMEs at the state-level. They partnered with the Government of Punjab and Global Alliance for Mass Entrepreneurship and conducted a process audit of 26 services across five departments: Labour, Local Government, Industries and Commerce, Housing and Urban Development and Punjab Pollution Control Board. As a part of this audit, CCS analysed administrative logs and conducted interviews with departmental officers and applicants to determine the reasons for delays and prescribed recommendations.
 The minimum capital requirement to register a business was Rs 100,000, no matter the size of the business. CCS’ work on Ease of Doing Business helped abolish it altogether.

Ease of doing business for farmers 
 Last year, CCS started working on agriculture sector reforms. It released a primer, From Annadata to Farmpreneur, assessing the variety of problems facing the development of profitable agriculture markets in India. They also released a policy brief, Unfree to Sell, that studied restrictions on domestic and international trade of farm produce.

Terracotta Environmentalism 
 CCS has recently restarted work on Terracotta Environmentalism where they focus on the role of communities, markets and incentives in achieving resilient and sustainable environmental action. CCS’ Terracotta vision focuses on restructuring incentives and encouraging cooperation over conflict in environmental conservation. In the past, CCS efforts led to the amendment of the Indian Forests Act 1927, classifying bamboo not as a tree but as grass, improving bamboo based livelihood opportunities for tribal communities and reducing the need for timber.

Governance

Quality of laws in India 
 Over the past two years, CCS has dived into the process of law-making in India. First, through the ‘Quality of Laws’ toolkit/ scorecard, drawn from global indices on regulatory quality and review of international literature on administrative law, it checks whether a law reflects public will, protects individual rights, and improves allocation of resources. They also worked in collaboration with Mercatus Center to calculate: volume of  laws, restrictiveness of laws and its complexity.

Repeal of Laws
 CCS launched the ‘Repeal 100 Laws Project’ in 2014 urging the Union government to repeal 100 laws identified as flawed, ineffective or redundant. In 2019, they launched the Repeal Law Compendium at the Constitution Club of India, New Delhi. The 6th edition of the compendium identified 150 laws for repeal in the North-East region of India.

Policy-training and Outreach 
 CCS Academy, the policy training wing of the Centre has a vibrant alumni base of 11,000 students, young professionals and media personnel. Through both introductory and advanced courses and internships including epolicies, eBaithaks, ecolloquiums, Researching Reality, CCS Academy has trained participants in liberal ideas.  CCS Academy has leveraged the online boom and expanded its reach across national borders, successfully engaging with 1000+ people through our online programs.
 In 2018, CCS incubated the Indian School of Public Policy (ISPP), aimed at developing leaders for policy action and democratising policy education. It is a one-year, post-graduate program in Policy, Design & Management.
 The Indian Liberals project, a joint initiative of CCS with the Friedrich Naumann Foundation ( South Asia) is an online archive of Indian Liberal works which includes magazines, periodicals, lectures and booklets in English, Hindi, Marathi, Gujarati etc covering the liberal thought in Indian history.

Science & Technology Policy Unit 
 Furthering over two decades of CCS’ commitment to advance social change through public policy, the Science & Technology Policy Unit has been conceptualised as the latest initiative. This unit will function as the policy wing  to advance policy solutions that foster scientific enquiry and research, and facilitate the creation and dissemination of new scientific knowledge. The Centre will work with all stakeholders to develop and strengthen the science ecosystem in India in order to advance scientific research and its translation into economic value and social good.

See also 
 Democracy in India
 Election Commission of India
 List of think tanks in India

References

External links
 Center for Civil Society Official site
 CCS Policy studies
 School Choice India Campaign
 RTE Portal
 Jeevika
 Azadi.me
 Swaminathan Aiyar
 Gurcharan Das
 Parth J Shah

Libertarian think tanks
Think tanks based in India
Organisations based in Delhi
Think tanks established in 1997
Libertarianism in India